An electromagnetic metasurface refers to a kind of artificial sheet material with sub-wavelength thickness. Metasurfaces can be either structured or unstructured with subwavelength-scaled patterns in the horizontal dimensions.

In  electromagnetic theory, metasurfaces modulate the behaviors of electromagnetic waves through  specific boundary conditions, rather than constitutive parameters in three dimensional (3D) space, which is commonly exploited in natural materials and metamaterials. Metasurfaces may also refer to the two-dimensional counterparts of metamaterials.

Definitions

Metasurfaces have been defined in several ways by researchers.

1, “An alternative approach that has gained increasing attention in recent years deals with one- and two-dimensional (1D and 2D) plasmonic arrays with subwavelength periodicity, also known as metasurfaces. Due to their negligible thickness compared to the wavelength of operation, metasurfaces can (near resonances of unit cell constituents) be considered as an interface of discontinuity enforcing an abrupt change in both the amplitude and phase of the impinging light”.

2, “Our results can be understood using the concept of a metasurface, a periodic array of scattering elements whose dimensions and periods are small compared with the operating wavelength”.

3, “Metasurfaces based on thin films”. A highly absorbing ultrathin film on a substrate can be also considered as a metasurface, with properties not occurring in natural materials. Following this definition, the thin metallic films such as that in superlens are also early type of metasurfaces.

History
The research of electromagnetic metasurfaces has a long history. Early in 1902, Robert W. Wood found that the reflection spectra of subwavelength metallic grating had dark areas. This unusual phenomenon was named Wood's anomaly and led to the discovery of the surface plasmon polariton (SPP), a particular electromagnetic wave excited at metal surfaces. Subsequently, another important phenomenon, the Levi-Civita relation, was introduced, which states that a subwavelength-thick film can result in a dramatic change in electromagnetic boundary conditions.

Generally speaking, metasurfaces could include some traditional concepts in the microwave spectrum such as frequency selective surfaces (FSS), impedance sheets and even Ohmic sheets. In the microwave regime, the thickness of these metasurfaces can be much smaller than the wavelength of operation (for example, 1/1000 of the wavelength), since the skin depth could be extremely small for highly conductive metals. Recently, some novel phenomena such as ultra-broadband coherent perfect absorption were demonstrated. The results showed that a 0.3 nm thick film could absorb all electromagnetic waves across the RF, microwave, and terahertz frequencies.

In optical applications, an anti-reflective coating could also be regarded as a simple metasurface, as first observed by Lord Rayleigh.

In recent years, several new metasurfaces have been developed, including plasmonic metasurfaces,
metasurfaces based on geometric phases,
metasurfaces based on impedance sheets, and glide-symmetric metasurfaces.

Applications

One of the most important applications of metasurfaces is to control a wavefront of electromagnetic waves by imparting local, gradient phase shifts to the incoming waves, which leads to a generalization of the ancient laws of reflection and refraction. In this way, a metasurface can be used as a planar lens, illumination lens, planar hologram, vortex generator, beam deflector, axicon and so on.

Besides the gradient metasurface lenses, metasurface-based superlenses offer another degree of control of the wavefront by using evanescent waves. With surface plasmons in the ultrathin metallic layers, perfect imaging and super-resolution lithography could be possible, which breaks the common assumption that all optical lens systems are limited by diffraction, a phenomenon called the diffraction limit.

Another promising application is in the field of stealth technology. A target's radar cross-section (RCS) has conventionally been reduced by either radiation-absorbent material (RAM) or by purpose shaping of the targets such that the scattered energy can be redirected away from the source. Unfortunately, RAMs have narrow frequency-band functionality, and purpose shaping limits the aerodynamic performance of the target. Metasurfaces have been synthesized that redirect scattered energy away from the source using either array theory  or the generalized Snell's law. This has led to aerodynamically favorable shapes for the targets with reduced RCS.

Metasurface can be also integrated with optical waveguides for controlling guided electromagnetic waves. Applications for meta-waveguides such as integrated waveguide mode convertors, structured-light generations,  versatile multiplexers, and photonic neural networks can be enabled.

In addition, metasurfaces are also applied in electromagnetic absorbers, polarization converters, and spectrum filters. Metasurface-empowered novel bioimaging and biosensing devices have also emerged and reported recently. For many optically based bioimaging devices, their bulk footprint and heavy physical weight have limited their usage in clinical settings.

Simulation 
To analyze such planar optical metasurfaces efficiently, prism-based algorithms allow for triangular prismatic space discretization, which is optimal for planar geometries. The prism-based algorithm has fewer elements than conventional tetrahedral methods, which in turn brings higher computational efficiency. A simulation toolkit has been released online, enabling users to efficiently analyze metasurfaces with customized pixel patterns.

Optical characterization 
Characterizing metasurfaces in the optical domain requires advanced imaging methods, since the involved optical properties often include both phase and polarization properties. Recent works suggest that vectorial ptychography, a recently developed computational imaging method, appears very relevant. It combines the Jones matrix mapping, together with a microscopic lateral resolution, even on large specimens.

References 

Photonics
Metamaterials